Manthira Punnagai is an 2022 Indian-Tamil-language romantic thriller drama television series, Based on Hindi-language Colors TV's drama series Ishq Mein Marjawan 2 written by Sameer Siddiqui, it tells a story of a Gayathri, Guru and Kathir. Kathir is a Police officer who wants a prove against Guru so that he can arrest him for his deeds. While, Guru is an over smart businessman who always makes his way out from Kathir’s trap. Kathir who missions to catch Guru red-handed sends his girlfriend Gayathiri into Guru’s world to bring proofs against him.

It starred Supritha Sathyanarayan, Niyaz and Hussain Ahamed Khan and produced by Thenandal Studio Limited. It premiered on Colors Tamil on 1 August 2022 and ended abruptly on 25 November 2022 with 81 episodes, and aired on Monday to Friday at 21:30 and available for streaming in selected markets on Voot. An industry first initiative of a 150-episode.

Cast

Main
 Mersheena Neenu / Supritha Sathyanarayan as Gayathiri: Kathir’s Ex Lover, Guru’s Wife, enters Guru’s house with the help of Cop Kathir to find her Sister.
 Niyaz as Guru: Smart businessman, Gayathri’s Husband, Preeti's love interest
 Hussain Ahamed Khan as Kathir: A Cunning Cop, Gayathiri Ex Lover and Guru’s step brother

Supporting

Production

Casting
Malayalam television Actress Mersheena Neenu was cast in the female lead role as Gayathri but later was replaced by Kannada television Actress Supritha Suryanarayan in October 2022. Lakshmi Stores fame Hussain Ahamed Khan was selected to play the role of Police officer Kathir making his comeback to Tamil Television, Pudhu Pudhu Arthangal fame Niyaz was play the role of smart businessman Guru. Besides Saravana Subbiah, Vadivukkarasi were cast then.

Release
The first promo was unveiled on 4 July 2022, Launching story promo, The second promo was unveiled on 17 July 2022, featuring protagonist Gayathri, Karthir and Guru Wedding promo.

References

Colors Tamil original programming
Tamil-language thriller television series
Tamil-language romance television series
Tamil-language mystery television series
Tamil-language police television series
2022 Tamil-language television series debuts
Tamil-language television shows
Television shows set in Tamil Nadu
2022 Tamil-language television series endings
Tamil-language television series based on Hindi-language television series